Samosely (— "self-settlers") are residents of the 30-kilometer Chernobyl Exclusion Zone surrounding the most heavily contaminated areas near the Chernobyl Nuclear Power Plant in Belarus and Ukraine.

Overview
The zone contains a number of abandoned towns and villages whose current population is made up of people who either refused to evacuate the area or secretly resettled in the relatively unprotected region after it was cordoned off. The majority of the samosely are elderly people who made their home in the area prior to the 1986 Chernobyl disaster, although some are disaffected settlers from outside the region. When the population was evacuated, they were initially told they could return in a few days, and many faced discrimination in areas of government resettlement. As of 2009, there are thought to be fewer than 400 remaining samosely of an earlier population estimated at over 10,000. Most are concentrated in the town of Chernobyl itself, with about half the population dispersed in other villages throughout the zone.

Population
In Ukraine, the population was estimated at 197 in 2012, down from 328 in 2007 and 612 in 1999. During the past 25 years, there were more than 900 deaths and just one birth in the Chernobyl Exclusion Zone. The only known birth occurred on 25 August 1999, when 46-year-old Lydia Sovenko gave birth to a healthy girl. Both Lydia and her husband, Mikhailo Bedernikov had returned to Chernobyl a few months earlier. The child, Maria Sovenko lived in Chernobyl until 2006. She now lives in a village outside the Exclusion Zone, attending a boarding school. Maria returns to Chernobyl only on weekends, to meet her mother who still lives there.

The average age of a Samosel was 63 in 2007. In 2012, the local administration unofficially granted permission to the elderly samosel to live in the area, but ordered all the younger inhabitants to move out. The total population in 2009 was reported to be 271. By 2016, the total population had fallen to about 180, most of them women.

Also, a few families live in the city of Chernobyl illegally, after migrating from areas outside the Exclusion Zone to escape poverty. These people have ignored government orders to leave the area, and are hostile to journalists. Local administration is claiming that the squatters have occupied several houses in the city, without proper permission from the original owners.

In April 2013 Minister of social policy of Ukraine Natalia Korolevska said the settlers are getting full social support from the government but she excluded possibility of legalizing their habitance in the Zone as it is still prohibited to live there. Also the Minister said the Ministry does not register illegal settlers but estimates their number for 2013 about 200–2,000 people.

Following the outbreak of the War in Donbas in 2014 refugees from that conflict settled in the Chernobyl Exclusion Zone or nearby.

References

External links

 Jeremiad for Belarus - Orionmagazine.org, Apr 2004, Vol. 23 Issue 2, p26
 Tourists Welcomed to Chernobyl - Earthtimes.org, 15 Dec 2010
 Королевська: у Чорнобильській зоні відчуження проживають до 2000 самоселів - Ukranews.com, 24 April 2013 

Chernobyl Exclusion Zone
Ukrainian slang
Ukrainian words and phrases
Pejorative demonyms
Society of Ukraine
Social groups